= Far East Builder =

Former architecture magazine in Hong Kong

Far East Builder was a trade magazine published from January 1935 to September 1971. Originated as the Hong Kong and South China Builder, a Hong Kong–based bi-monthly trade magazine covering building, property, and urban development across British colonies and the wider Asia-Pacific region. With representatives in Tsingtao, Kobe, and Manila, it served readers in Hong Kong, Mainland China, Macao, the Philippines, and Malaya.

Shortly before the outbreak of the World War II, the publication was renamed the Hong Kong and Far East Builder. Its publication was then interrupted for seven years by the war, resuming in 1948 under the same title with a renewed focus on post-war reconstruction, planning, and housing development.

Far East Builder was distributed monthly to the professionals of the building industry free-of-charge internationally. The countries included South Korea, Taiwan, Hong Kong, South Vietnam, Thailand, Philippines, Cambodia, Laos, Malaysia, Singapore, etc. Its operation was supported by corporate advertisers.

== Hong Kong era ==
It was distributed under a number of titles:

- Hong Kong and South China Builder (1936–1941) (Note: Since Volume 3 was published in 1938, it is reasonable to assume that Volume 1 came out in 1936. And its title in 1935 is unclear.)
- Hong Kong and Far East Builder (1941; 1948–1964)
- Far East Architect and Builder (1965–1968)
- Far East Builder (April 1968–September 1971)

The publication underwent numerous editorial and ownership changes. It was founded by Hong Kong Builder Ltd in 1935, with Henry Grave serving as managing editor until his death in 1958. During the 1960s, the publisher was renamed from Hong Kong Building Service Ltd to Federal Publications Ltd, and later Far East Publications Ltd.

== Leaving Hong Kong ==
Following its acquisition by Singapore Straits Times Publishing, the publication increasingly focused on architecture and construction in Singapore and Southeast Asia. It was distributed under:

- Asian Building and Construction (October 1971–September 1980)
- Asian Architect and Contractor (1982–2003)

In October 1971, the publication adopted the new title Asian Building and Construction. In 1960s, Far East Trade Press became jointly owned by Singapore Straits Times Publishing, which became a major shareholder in 1977. Acquired by Thomson Publication Asia Ltd in 1973, the journal was relaunched in 1982 as Asian Architect and Contractor, continuing publication until 2003. And, it became the official journal of the International Federation of Asian and Western Pacific Contractors’ Associations. It absorbed Asia Pacific Contractor in 1983 and Asian Interior Designer in 2001.
